Widad Amel Ramdane Djamel, known as WA Ramdane Djamel for short, is an Algerian football club based in the town of Ramdane Djamel. The club was founded in 1966 and its colours are red and white. The club currently plays in the east division of the Ligue Nationale du Football Amateur, the third tier in the Algerian football system.

In the 2010–11 season, WA Ramdane Djamel finished fourth in their group in the Inter-Régions Division and won promotion to the Ligue Nationale du Football Amateur. It was their fourth promotion in a row.

References

Association football clubs established in 1966
Football clubs in Algeria
Skikda Province
1966 establishments in Algeria
Sports clubs in Algeria